{{Infobox surname
| name = Tagle
| caption = <small>Tagle shield</small>
| meaning = Frontier
| region = Spain, Portugal
| language = Spanish, Portuguese, Arabic
}}Tagle''' is a Spanish surname originating from a place in Santander province.

List of persons with the surname
Luis Sánchez de Tagle, 1st Marquis of Altamira (1642–1710) Spanish aristocrat
Luisa Pérez de Tagle, 4th Marquesa of Altamira (1715–1736), Spanish-Mexican aristocrat
Manuel Rodriguez de Albuerne y Pérez de Tagle, 5th Marquis of Altamira (1733–1791), Spanish-Mexican aristocrat
Manuela Sánchez de Tagle, 3rd Marquesa of Altamira, Spanish-Mexican aristocrat
Pedro Sánchez de Tagle, 2nd Marquis of Altamira (1661–1723), Spanish aristocrat
Anna Maria Perez de Taglé (born 1990), American actress and singer
Bárbara Ruiz-Tagle (born 1979), Chilean actress of theater and television
Carlos Ruiz-Tagle (1932–1991), Chilean writer
Eduardo Frei Ruiz-Tagle (born 1942), Chilean politician and civil engineer, President of Chile 1994–2000
Francisco Ruiz-Tagle (1790–1860), Chilean political figure
José María Hurtado Ruiz-Tagle (born 1945), Chilean politician, member of the National Renewal (RN) party
Sara Larraín Ruiz-Tagle (born 1952), Chilean politician and environmentalist, ran for president in 1999
Alfonso Tagle, Sr or Panchito Alba (1925–1995), FAMAS award-winning Filipino film actor
Hilda G. Tagle (born 1946), Senior United States District Judge in the Southern District of Texas
José Bernardo de Tagle y Bracho, 1st Marquis of Torre Tagle (1644–1740), Peruvian aristocrat
José Bernardo de Tagle y Portocarrero, Marquis of Torre Tagle (1779–1825), Peruvian soldier and politician
Jose Tagle (1854–1902), roled in the Battle of Imus
Luis Antonio Tagle (born 1957), Filipino Roman Catholic Cardinal, Prefect of the Congregation for the Evangelization of Peoples
Protasio Tagle, Mexican soldier and politician who lived in the 19th century
Rosa Juliana Sánchez de Tagle, Marquesa of Torre Tagle (1647–1761), Peruvian aristocrat
Sarita Pérez de Tagle (born 1986), Filipina cinema and television actress
Juan Antonio de Tagle y Bracho, Count of Casa Tagle de Trasierra (1685–1750), Spanish/Peruvian aristocrat

See also
Tangle (disambiguation)
Teagle (disambiguation)

Spanish-language surnames

References